Heinrich Friedrich Otto Abel (22 January 1824 – 28 October 1854) was a German historian.

Life
He was born at Reichenbach Priory in the Kingdom of Württemberg, a Protestant religious house, where his father was a clergyman. Beginning in 1824, Abel visited the universities of Tübingen, Jena, Heidelberg, Bonn and Berlin, studying history. Among his teachers was Friedrich Christoph Dahlmann.

Abel also showed political interest in the revolutions of 1848, and published a tract Das neue deutsche Reich und sein Kaiser ("The New German Empire and his Emperor") n which he enthused about the Kingdom of Prussia. As a result, the Prussian minister of external affairs, Heinrich von Arnim, offered him a place in the Prussian embassy in Frankfurt. However, his high expectations were disappointed many times over. He quit the diplomatic service in 1850 and in the ensuing period devoted his energies to the Monumenta Germaniae Historica.

In 1851, Abel inaugurated his formal academic career with his appointment as a lecturer ("Privatdozent") at the University of Bonn. The best known of his scholars was Heinrich von Treitschke. While travelling in 1853, Abel was affected by pulmonary phthisis and died in 1854 in the care of his uncle in Leonberg.

Publications

 Makedonien vor König Philipp, Leipzig, 1847
 Das neue deutsche Reich und sein Kaiser, 1848
 König Philipp der Hohenstaufe, 1852
 Die politische Bedeutung Kölns am Ende des 12. Jahrhunderts, 1852
 Die deutschen Personennamen, 1853
 Theodat, König der Ostgoten, Stuttgart, 1855
 Kaiser Otto IV und König Friderich II, Berlin, post mortem 1856

Sources

 Allgemeine Deutsche Biographie - online version at Wikisource

1824 births
1854 deaths
People from Freudenstadt (district)
People from the Kingdom of Württemberg
University of Tübingen alumni
University of Jena alumni
Heidelberg University alumni
University of Bonn alumni
Academic staff of the University of Bonn
Humboldt University of Berlin alumni
19th-century German historians
19th-century German writers
19th-century German male writers
German male non-fiction writers
19th-century deaths from tuberculosis
Tuberculosis deaths in Germany